African Express Airways is a Somali-owned Kenyan airline with its head office at Jomo Kenyatta International Airport in Embakasi, Nairobi, Kenya.

Services
African Express Airways is a short-haul airline, which caters to business and leisure travellers and operates daily departures. It also has an Associate Jet Aircraft Maintenance Company located near its head offices. Jet Aircraft Maintenance Ltd is a firm specialized in jet aircraft maintenance, which ranges from 'A' to 'B', 'C' and 'D' checks for most medium-range aircraft of Western manufacture. The company has a new in situ hangar equipped with all facilities, including maintenance hangar rental services for third parties who may have their own engineers and approvals.

Destinations

Current destinations
As of February 2021, African Express Airways operates services to the following domestic and international scheduled destinations:

Kenya
 Nairobi - Jomo Kenyatta International Airport base

Somalia
 Bosaso - Bosaso Airport
 Garowe - Garowe Airport
 Kismayo - Kismayo Airport
 Mogadishu - Aden Adde International Airport 
 Hargeisa - Hargeisa International Airport

Former destinations
The airline previously also served the following airports:

Comoros
Moroni – Prince Said Ibrahim International Airport
Egypt
Cairo – Cairo International Airport
Kenya
Mombasa – Moi International Airport
Eldoret – Eldoret International Airport
Kisumu – Kisumu International Airport
Somalia
Galkaiyo – Abdullahi Yusuf International Airport
Berbera – Berbera Airport
United Arab Emirates
Dubai – Dubai International Airport
Sharjah – Sharjah International Airport
Yemen
Aden – Aden International Airport
Mukalla – Riyan Mukalla Airport
Seiyun – Seiyun Airport

Fleet

Current fleet
The African Express Airways fleet consists of the following aircraft (as of February 2021):

Former fleet
 Embraer EMB 120ER Brasilia

Accidents and incidents 

 4 May 2020: An East African Express Airways Embraer EMB 120 Brasilia, registration number 5Y-AXO, on an air charter flight delivering pandemic relief supplies, crashed on approach to Berdale, Somalia, killing all 2 crew and 4 non-revenue passengers on board. On 10 May, a leaked African Union peacekeeping force report alleged that ground troops of the Ethiopian National Defense Force who were operating outside the peacekeeping force's authority mistakenly concluded that the aircraft was engaged in a suicide attack and shot it down; this allegation ignited controversy over Ethiopian and Kenyan military incursions into Somalia to fight Al-Shabaab militants there. The three countries have initiated a joint investigation of the accident.

See also
Airlines of Africa

References

External links

Airlines of Kenya
Airlines established in 1999
Kenyan companies established in 1999